Urrbrae is a suburb of Adelaide, South Australia. It is located in the City of Mitcham.

Located at the foot of the Adelaide Hills, it is bordered on the east by the South Eastern Freeway, and the Old Toll House, which marked the traditional entrance to the city of Adelaide in the 19th century.

History
In the early 1850s, Robert Forsyth Macgeorge bought land in the area and built a house, naming the estate Urrbrae after the village Haugh of Urr in Scotland; the word brae refers to a hillside, especially near a river or creek. One notable son was the architect James Macgeorge (1832–1918).

Demographics

The 2016 Census by the Australian Bureau of Statistics counted 966 persons in Urrbrae on census night. Of these, 47.3% were male and 52.7% were female.

The majority of residents (68.5%) were of Australian birth, with other common census responses being China (5.3%) and England (5.2%).

The age distribution of Urrbrae residents was comparable to that of the greater Australian population. 71.1% of residents were over 25 years in 2016, compared to the Australian average of 68.5%; and 28.9% were younger than 25 years, compared to the Australian average of 31.5%.

Attractions

Urrbrae House Historic Precinct

Urrbrae House is a two-storey, bluestone mansion located on Walter Young Avenue, on the Waite Campus of the University of Adelaide. Not the suburb's namesake, the current house was actually completed in 1891 by the philanthropist Peter Waite, replacing the original single-storey home of Robert MacGeorge, which was for many years rented by Edward Stirling Snr. It was probably Waite, a Scot like MacGeorge, who opted to carry on the name Urrbrae.

For many years, Urrbrae House was the family home of Waite, his wife Matilda and their family. After Peter and Matilda's death, the house was bequeathed to the University of Adelaide, being handed over in February 1923 by the couple's two daughters.

Urrbrae House was the first home in Adelaide to be electrified.

The house and its surrounds now constitute the Urrbrae House Historic Precinct within the university campus.

St Paul's Retreat Monastery
On Cross Road, in the suburb's north, lies the Roman Catholic monastery of St Paul's Retreat. Formerly an oriental-style mansion named The Glen, the house was occupied for several years by a retired Indian judge. Later, the house passed to the Boothby family before being sold in 1896 to the Passionist Catholic order.

As well as the monastery, St Paul's Retreat includes a convent and other facilities lying outside the suburb.

Waite Research Precinct
As well as the University of Adelaide's Waite Campus, the precinct contains:
Australian Centre for Plant Functional Genomics (ACPFG);
Australian Grain Technologies
Australian Wine Research Institute (AWRI);
CSIRO research laboratories;
 Primary Industries and Regions SA (PIRSA)
South Australian Research and Development Institute (SARDI)
Urrbrae Agricultural High School

University of Adelaide Waite Campus
The University of Adelaide's Waite Campus is primarily located in the west and southwest of Urrbrae, extending into the neighbouring suburbs of Springfield and Brown Hill Creek.

Developed on land bequeathed by the late owner of Urrbrae House, Peter Waite, Waite Campus holds several research facilities:

Waite Research Institute (WRI)
Waite Conservation Reserve
Waite Arboretum

Parks
There are parks and small reserves throughout the suburb.

Transport

Roads
Cross Road forms the northern boundary of Urrbrae and Fullarton Road forms part of the eastern boundary. The South Eastern freeway starts from here too.

Public transport
Urrbrae is serviced by public transport run by the Adelaide Metro.

Climate

See also
List of Adelaide suburbs

References

External links

Suburbs of Adelaide